The scaly thrush (Zoothera dauma) is a member of the thrush family Turdidae.

Distribution and habitat
It breeds in wet coniferous taiga, mainly in the Himalayas through Malaysia.

Description
The sexes are similar, 27–31 cm long, with black scaling on a paler white or yellowish background. The most striking identification feature in flight is the black band on the white underwings, a feature shared with Siberian thrush. The male has a song which is a loud, far-carrying mechanical whistle, with 5-10 second pauses between each one second long phrase twee...tuuu....tuuu....tuuu.

Taxonomy
There are several races which are now often split into a varying number of separate species. Z.  aurea (White's thrush), including the questionable subspecies Z. a. toratugumi, is the migratory Siberian and north-east Asian form. Z. neilgherriensis (Nilgiri thrush) is resident in the hills of southwest India. Z. imbricata (Sri Lanka thrush) is endemic to the hills of Sri Lanka and is particularly distinctive, being smaller, long-billed and rufous below. Z. d. dauma (scaly thrush) breeds in the Himalaya and migrates to the foothills in winter. Z. d. horsfieldi (Horsfield's thrush) is resident in Indonesia on the islands of Sumatra, Java, Bali, Lombok and Sumbawa. Z. major (Amami thrush) is restricted to the Amami Islands in Japan and is now considered a distinct species.

The taxonomy of this group is still in flux. Some of these subspecies are very similar and the identity of some populations, such as those on Taiwan, is uncertain.

The fawn-breasted thrush (Z. machiki) of Indonesia and the Bassian thrush (Z. lunulata) and russet-tailed thrush (Z. heinei) of Australia were also included in Z. dauma in the past.

Behaviour
The scaly thrush is very secretive, preferring dense cover.  It nests in trees, laying three or four dull green eggs in a neat cup nest.  It is omnivorous, eating a wide range of insects, earthworms and berries.

References

 Brazil, Mark (2009) Birds of East Asia, Christopher Helm, London.
 Collar, N. J. (2004) Species limits in some Indonesian thrushes, Forktail, 20: 71–87.
 Internet Bird Collection. Common Scaly Thrush (Zoothera dauma). Retrieved 10 January 2010.
 Birds of India by Grimmett, Inskipp and Inskipp, 
 Thrushes by Clement and Hathaway,

External links

White's thrush caught at the birdringgingstation at Schiermonnikoog, Netherlands

scaly thrush
Birds of Central China
Birds of Myanmar
Birds of Laos
Birds of Thailand
Birds of Vietnam
Birds of Yunnan
Birds of the Himalayas
scaly thrush
scaly thrush